Alexey Sergeevich Kruglov (born March 8, 1986), known as The Istra Maniac, is a Russian serial killer, rapist and pedophile. He raped and killed 4 children in the Istrinsky District of the Moscow Oblast.

Biography 
On July 19, 2005, 12-year-old Mikhail Elshin, along with his 10-year-old brother Alexander and 11-year-old friend Pavel Sokolov left the hostel at a weaving factory in Dedovsk to take a walk, but did not return home in the evening. The killer had met the three boys in the area of Christmas Road, when they were returning from the walk. He offered them a ride to the railway station, but eventually turned the car towards a field. On July 29 in the Istrinsky District, not far from the Luzhki village, the mutilated body of Mikhail Elshin was found. On August 1, one and a half kilometres away from the discovery site of Mikhail's body, the bodies of Alexander Elshin and Pavel Sokolov were found. The corpses were covered with foliage and were severely disfigured. The triple murder remained unsolved for about 4 years.

In May 2009, Kruglov decided to strangle his 14-year-old niece. He offered the girl to give her a lift to school. She agreed, but Kruglov instead took her to the Istrinsky District, where he strangled her with a USB cord. After this murder, he was arrested. During the interrogations, he immediately confessed to all four murders. Examinations recognized him as sane, and according to the conclusions of doctors, his actions were "demonstrative".

In 2010, Alexey Kruglov was sentenced to life imprisonment.

See also
 List of Russian serial killers

References

External links 
 Dmitry Karelin: Istra Maniac is deprived from life at large. Gazeta.ru. Accessed on June 17, 2012

1986 births
Living people
Male serial killers
Prisoners sentenced to life imprisonment by Russia
Russian murderers of children
Russian rapists
Russian serial killers